Alain Fuss (born 10 July 1968 in La Tronche) is a Paralympian athlete from France competing mainly in category T54 long-distance events.

Alain has competed in two Paralympics.  His first appearance in Athens in 2004 he competed in the T54 5000m, 10000m and marathon without any medal success.  Four years later in Beijing at the 2008 Summer Paralympics he competed in the T54 1500m, 5000m and 10000m  again without winning a medal but did pick up a medal as part of the bronze medal-winning French team in the T53/54 4 × 400 m.

References 
 
 

1968 births
Living people
Paralympic athletes of France
Paralympic bronze medalists for France
Paralympic medalists in athletics (track and field)
Athletes (track and field) at the 2004 Summer Paralympics
Athletes (track and field) at the 2008 Summer Paralympics
Athletes (track and field) at the 2012 Summer Paralympics
Medalists at the 2008 Summer Paralympics
Sportspeople from La Tronche
21st-century French people